Bilel Bellahcene (born 1998) is an Algerian chess player. He holds the title of Grandmaster (GM). Born in Strasbourg, France, he changed his federation from France to Algeria in July 2018.

Chess career
As of January 2021, Bellahcene is the top-ranked player in Algeria.

Bellahcene represented Algeria on Board 1 in the 2018 Chess Olympiad.

Bellahcene won the 2019 FIDE Zone 4.1 Championship with a perfect 9 out of 9 to qualify for the Chess World Cup 2019. In the first round, he came close to upsetting Hikaru Nakamura, holding the much higher-rated player to two draws in the classical games before losing in the tie-breaks.

References

External links

Bilel Bellahcene games at 365Chess.com 

1998 births
Living people
Algerian chess players
Chess grandmasters
Chess Olympiad competitors
African Games medalists in chess
21st-century Algerian people
Competitors at the 2019 African Games
African Games silver medalists for Algeria
African Games bronze medalists for Algeria